West Coast-Tasman is a New Zealand parliamentary electorate.

Population centres
West Coast-Tasman is the second-largest general electorate in New Zealand, behind . It is one of the longest. The electorate was not changed in the 2013/14 review.

The electorate includes the following population centres:
Collingwood
Tākaka
Motueka
Tapawera
Brightwater
Wakefield
Westport
Reefton
Greymouth
Hokitika
Ross
Hari Hari
Whataroa
Franz Josef
Fox Glacier
Haast

History
The electorate was formed in 1996 for the mixed-member proportional (MMP) voting system by combining the former Tasman and West Coast electorates.

Damien O'Connor was the first representative and he held the electorate until the 2008 general election, when he was beaten by National candidate Chris Auchinvole, who had previously been a list MP. Auchinvole's majority was 971. His position on the Labour Party list meant that O'Connor couldn't return to Parliament immediately. When the list MP Michael Cullen retired in May 2009, O'Connor regained his position as Member of the House of Representatives because he was the highest-ranked candidate on the list not already an MP.

Auchinvole retired from politics at the end of the 2011–2014 parliamentary term, and former Mayor of Westland District, Maureen Pugh, gained the nomination for the National Party. O'Connor was once again successful.

Members of Parliament
West Coast-Tasman has been represented by two electorate MPs so far:

Key

List MPs
Members of Parliament elected from party lists in elections where that person also unsuccessfully contested the West Coast-Tasman electorate. Unless otherwise stated, all MPs terms began and ended at general elections.

1In the  Damien O'Connor's list position of 37 meant he was not returned until Michael Cullen resigned in May 2009.
2Kevin Hague resigned from Parliament on 7 October 2016.
3Maureen Pugh's list position of 52 meant she became elected after Tim Groser resigned in December 2015. She assumed office in early 2016 and was not returned to Parliament at the 2017 election, until the resignation of Bill English.
4Maureen Pugh's list position of 44 meant she became elected after Bill English resigned in February 2018. She assumed office in early 2018.

Election results

2020 election

2017 election

2014 election

2011 election

Electorate (as at 26 November 2011): 44,556

2008 election

2005 election

1999 election
Refer to Candidates in the New Zealand general election 1999 by electorate#West Coast-Tasman for a list of candidates.

Table footnotes

References

External links
Profile  Parliamentary Library

New Zealand electorates
1996 establishments in New Zealand